Chlöe Howl (born Chlöe Louise Howells; 4 March 1995), is a British singer-songwriter. She was shortlisted for the BBC Sound of 2014 and the 2014 BRIT Awards: Critics Choice Award.

Career

Early life
Chlöe Howl (real name Chlöe Howells) was born on 4 March 1995 in England. The unusual use of the diaeresis above the "o" in her name is said to be a mistake her parents made on her birth certificate. Her father is from Wales and her mother is English. She grew up in the village of Holyport, near Maidenhead, Berkshire. She attended Holyport Primary, and then Altwood Secondary School. At the age of 10 she recorded and sold her own Christmas CD (singing All I Want for Christmas Is You) to help raise funds for her primary school.
Howl left school aged 16 and signed a record deal with Columbia Records shortly afterwards. For a brief time she worked in an office, but spent much of the following three years writing and recording songs for her debut album.

2013–present
On 4 March 2013, her first extended play, Rumour, was released for free download. In June 2013, she released the video for her first single, "No Strings". She released a second extended play No Strings on 26 August. "No Strings" was part of the soundtrack for the movie Kick-Ass 2. On 9 December 2013, her second single "Paper Heart" was released.

On 2 December 2013 she was nominated for the BBC Sound of 2014. On 5 December 2013 she was shortlisted for the 2014 BRIT Awards: Critics' Choice Award, eventually finishing behind Sam Smith. Howl was included in the New Artists 2014 list by iTunes, along with MØ, Sam Smith and Dan Croll. Howl supported Ellie Goulding at some of her 2014 shows in Europe. In March 2014 she released "Rumour" as her third single.

It was expected that her debut studio album Chlöe Howl would be released in 2014 by Columbia Records (Sony Music), but by April 2015 it was being reported that she had left Sony Music. She released a new single "Bad Dream" via the indie label Heavenly Songs in April 2015. In May 2015 she teamed up with fashion house Fendi to model their new range of Orchidea sunglasses. In June 2016 she appeared alongside Ella Eyre in a video promoting the Nintendo 3DS handheld console.

Her single, "Magnetic" was released on 16 June 2017, followed by "Do It Alone" which was released on 26 October 2017. Howl released "Work" on 4 October 2018, the lead single from her EP of the same name, released on 29 November 2018. Howl released "Millionaire" on 7 March 2019. Howl released "In the Middle (Sad Banger)" on 7 June 2019.

Discography

EPs

Singles

As lead artist

As featured artist

Music videos

Awards and nominations

References

External links
 
 

1995 births
Bisexual singers
Bisexual songwriters
Bisexual women
English LGBT singers
English LGBT songwriters
Living people
English women singer-songwriters
Pansexual musicians
Pansexual women
21st-century English women singers
20th-century LGBT people
21st-century LGBT people
English women songwriters